David Dean (born February 3, 1964) is an American football coach and former player, currently head coach of the West Georgia Wolves. Dean served as the head football coach at Valdosta State University from 2007 to 2015, compiling a record of 79–27 in nine seasons.  His team won the NCAA Division II Football Championship in 2007 and in 2012.

Playing career
Dean attended Avondale High School in Avondale Estates, Georgia before walking on for the Georgia Tech football team in 1982. He earned a scholarship the following year and played through the 1985 season as a wide receiver.  He was a graduate assistant for the team in 1986.

Coaching career
Dean coached wide receivers at his alma mater, Avondale High School, in 1987.  He was an assistant at Valdosta from 1988 to 1992.  From 1993 to 1999 he was an assistant at University of West Georgia. From 2000 to 2006 he was offensive coordinator for Valdosta. In his first season in 2000 his quarterback Dusty Bonner won the Harlon Hill Trophy. During this period Valdosta played in the Division II title game in 2002 and won the national championship in 2004.

Head coaching career
In 2007, Dean was named head coach of the Blazers in 2007 after Chris Hatcher took the head coaching job at Georgia Southern University. The "Dean Machine" started the season with five straight wins. Delta State University defeated the Blazers 35–31, despite being down 28 points at the beginning of the second half. The Blazers then capped off the season with an eight-game winning streak and their second national championship title win against Northwest Missouri State University, 25–20. This was the third straight championship appearance by the Bearcats, also the third straight time the Bearcats lost the national championship game. Dean is only the second head coach to lead his team to a national championship in his first season. Earle Solomonson accomplished this at North Dakota State University in 1985.

2008 saw the Blazers make it to the second round of the NCAA Division II playoffs and a 9–3 season, 6–2 in the Gulf South Conference. In 2009, after a 6–4 season in which they finished third in the Gulf South Conference, the Blazers did not make the postseason for the first time under Dean, and for the first time since 2006.
Dean led the Blazers to an 8–3 record and back into the NCAA Division II playoffs in 2010, marking the third time in his four years he has led his squad to postseason play. After beginning the year unranked, the Blazers rose as high as #7 in the AFCA poll, before finishing the regular season ranked #17.

In 2011, the Blazers had another 6–4 season and missed the Division II playoffs.  VSU finished 4th in the Gulf South Conference in 2011.  Valdosta had been ranked as high as No. 4 in the AFCA poll in the first weeks of the 2011 season.

After a 2–2 start to the 2012 season, the Blazers won their next 10 straight games and defeated Winston-Salem State University 35–7 in the NCAA Division II Championship game in Florence, Alabama.  VSU finished second in the Gulf South Conference after losing to the University of West Alabama.  Valdosta would defeat UWA after playing them again in the second round of the NCAA Playoffs.  David Dean is the first football coach in Valdosta State's history to win two national titles.

Dean left Valdosta State to coach a single, unsuccessful year as co-offensive coordinator at FBS program Georgia Southern; both co-coordinators were fired after one year. On January 25, 2017, Dean was named the new head coach of former Gulf South Conference rival West Georgia.

Awards and honors
Dean was the American Football Coaches Association (AFCA) Division II Coach of the Year in NCAA Division II in 2007 and in 2012, after seasons culminating in National Championships. Dean was also named the 2007 Division II Coach of the Year by American Football Weekly and Schutt Sports. Dean was a runner up for Liberty Mutual Coach of the Year in 2008 for Division II.  In 2010, he was the AFCA Regional Coach of the Year for NCAA Division II Region 2 and the Gulf South Conference's Co-Coach of the Year.

Head coaching record

References

External links
 West Georgia Wolves bio

1964 births
Living people
Georgia Southern Eagles football coaches
Georgia Tech Yellow Jackets football coaches
Georgia Tech Yellow Jackets football players
Valdosta State Blazers football coaches
West Georgia Wolves football coaches
High school football coaches in Georgia (U.S. state)
People from Avondale Estates, Georgia
People from Decatur, Georgia
Coaches of American football from Georgia (U.S. state)
Players of American football from Georgia (U.S. state)
Sportspeople from DeKalb County, Georgia